Vernon Irvin Cheadle (February 6, 1910 – July 23, 1995) was an American botanist, educator and university administrator. He served as the second chancellor of the University of California, Santa Barbara (UCSB) from 1962 until 1977.

He was born in Salem, South Dakota, and received his undergraduate degree from Miami University in Ohio in 1932, and a master's degree and Ph.D. in botany from Harvard University.

He was an active masters athlete and held the M75 world record in the shot put, set at his home track at UCSB, for over a decade.

Cheadle became UCSB's second chancellor at a time when local leaders in Santa Barbara, California had already been fighting tenaciously for several decades to establish a research university in their community.  Cheadle gave them what they had desired for so long: the transformation of UCSB from a small liberal arts college into a research university. However, Cheadle was severely traumatized by the turmoil of the anti-Vietnam War era of the late 1960s, when Governor Ronald Reagan declared martial law and deployed heavily armed California National Guard troops to the UCSB campus.  As a result, Cheadle became so passive for the remainder of his chancellorship that from 1972 to 1977, real power on campus lay in the hands of Vice Chancellor Alec Alexander.

References

Chancellors of the University of California, Santa Barbara
1910 births
1995 deaths
Botanical Society of America
Harvard Graduate School of Arts and Sciences alumni
Miami University alumni
University of California, Santa Barbara faculty
People from Salem, South Dakota
20th-century American botanists
20th-century American academics